Robert Hauser may refer to:

 Robert M. Hauser, American sociologist
 Robert B. Hauser, American cinematographer